Abscess was an American death metal band from Oakland, California. The band was formed in June 1994 by Chris Reifert and Danny Coralles, both former members of Autopsy. Abscess disbanded in 2010.

Members
Last lineup
Chris Reifert - drums, vocals (1994-2010)
Danny Coralles - guitar (1994-2010)
Joe Allen (Joe Trevisano) - bass (1998-2000, 2002-2010)

Past members
Clint Bower - guitar, vocals (1994-2010)
Frank "Freeway" Migliore - bass (1994-1997)
Jim Mack - bass (2000-02)

Discography

Studio albums
Seminal Vampires and Maggot Men (1996)
Tormented (2000)
Through the Cracks of Death (2002)
Damned and Mummified (2004)
Horrorhammer (2007)
Dawn of Inhumanity (2010)

Live albums
Pustulation of Embrionic Flesh (live on KZSU) (1994)

Compilation albums
Urine Junkies (1995)
Thirst for Blood, Hunger for Flesh (2003)

EPs
Throbbing Black Werebeast (1997)

Demos
Abscess (1994)
Raw Sick & Brutal Noize! (1994)
Crawled up from the Sewer (1995)
Filthy Fucking Freaks (1995)
Open Wound (1998)

Splits
Split with Deranged (10", 2001)
Split with Machetazo (CD, 2001)
Split with Bloodred Bacteria (CD, 2001)
Split with Bonesaw (CD, 2008)
 Split with Population Reduction (CD, 2009)

References

External links
Official Abscess Web page
Abscess at MySpace

Death metal musical groups from California
American doom metal musical groups
Hardcore punk groups from California
Relapse Records artists
Musical groups established in 1994
Musical groups disestablished in 2010
Musical quartets
1994 establishments in California
Listenable Records artists